Derrick Steven Fenner (born April 6, 1967), is a former professional American football player who was selected by the Seattle Seahawks in the 10th round of the 1989 NFL Draft. A 6'3" 235-lb. running back from the University of North Carolina, Fenner played in 120 NFL games from 1989 to 1997. His best year as a pro came during the 1990 season for the Seahawks when he scored 15 touchdowns (14 rushing and 1 receiving).

In 1987, Fenner spent time in jail after being arrested and charged for a murder. He was later released after his lawyer established that he had not been at the scene of the crime.  In 1988, he pleaded guilty to cocaine possession and received probation.  As a result of his legal troubles, the University of North Carolina parted ways with him and Fenner went into the NFL draft. After Football he made his home with his wife and 2 children in Seattle.

References 

1967 births
Living people
People from Washington, D.C.
American football fullbacks
North Carolina Tar Heels football players
Seattle Seahawks players
Cincinnati Bengals players
Oakland Raiders players